Pachliopta kotzebuea, the pink rose, is a butterfly of the family Papilionidae (the swallowtails). It is found in the Philippines.

Food plants include birthwort (Aristolochia) species.

Etymology
The species was named for Otto von Kotzebue, commander of the Russian expeditionary ship Rurik. Johann Friedrich von Eschscholtz served as physician and naturalist aboard the Rurik on a circumnavigational voyage from 1815–1818.

Subspecies
P. k. bilara (Page & Treadaway, 1995) (Philippines (Bohol, Cebu))
P. k. deseilus (Fruhstorfer, 1911) (Philippines (Mindoro, Marinduque, Masbate, Ticao, Panay, Negros, Sibuyan Islands))
P. k. kotzebuea (Philippines (western and central Luzon))
P. k. mataconga (Page & Treadaway, 1995) (Philippines (southern Luzon))
P. k. philippus (Semper, 1891) (Philippines (Samar, Leyte, Dinagar, Mindanao, Panaon, Camiguin de Mindanao, Siargao, Homonhon, Sarangani))
P. k. tindongana (Page & Treadaway, 1995) (Philippines (north-eastern Luzon, Babuyanes))

References

Page M.G.P & Treadaway, C.G. (2003). Schmetterlinge der Erde, Butterflies of the World Part XVII (17), Papilionidae IX Papilionidae of the Philippine Islands. Edited by Erich Bauer and Thomas Frankenbach. Keltern:Goecke & Evers; Canterbury: Hillside Books. 

Pachliopta
Lepidoptera of the Philippines
Butterflies of Asia
Endemic fauna of the Philippines
Butterflies described in 1821
Taxa named by Johann Friedrich von Eschscholtz